Jeff Lepa (born 10 September 1991) is a Samoan international rugby union player who currently plays as a lock or loose forward for  in New Zealand's domestic Mitre 10 Cup.

Early career

Born in Apia, capital city of Samoa, Lepa emigrated to New Zealand as a child.   He made the Linwood College first XV at the age of 14 and later transferred to the prestigious Christchurch Boys' High School with whom he played in 2009.   Upon leaving school, he joined the Waimea Old Boys' Club in the Tasman club league.

Senior career

Lepa's club form saw him first named in the Tasman Makos provincial squad in 2014, however he didn't get any game time.   He debuted for the Makos the following season, making 3 substitute appearances.   His first start came in 2016 and he made 2 appearances during the season as Tasman reached the Premiership final before going down to

International

Based largely on excellent club form for the Waimea Old Boys, Lepa was called up by the land of his birth, ahead of the 2016 mid-year rugby union internationals.

References

1991 births
Living people
Samoan rugby union players
Samoa international rugby union players
Rugby union locks
Rugby union flankers
Rugby union number eights
Tasman rugby union players
Sportspeople from Apia
People educated at Christchurch Boys' High School
Samoan emigrants to New Zealand
People educated at Linwood College